Anthony Brown (born 30 March 1961) is an Australian cricketer. He played in two first-class matches for Queensland between 1983 and 1986.

See also
 List of Queensland first-class cricketers

References

External links
 

1961 births
Living people
Australian cricketers
Queensland cricketers
Cricketers from Brisbane